Eppington is a historic plantation house located near Winterpock, Chesterfield County, Virginia.  It was built about 1768, and consists of a three-bay, -story, central block with hipped roof, dormers, modillion cornice, and flanking one-story wings in the Georgian style. It has a later two-story rear ell. It features two tall exterior end chimneys which rise from the roof of the wings. It was listed on the National Register of Historic Places in 1969.

History

The Eppes and Jeffersons
Its builder, Francis Eppes, was brother-in-law and first cousin of Martha Jefferson (1748–1782), the wife of Thomas Jefferson.  After her death, Eppes and his wife raised Jefferson's two daughters, while their father was Minister to France. Charles Eppes sent samples of American trees, including Bald Cypress, Eastern Red Cedar, Southern Magnolia and Wax-myrtle as well as hams from Monticello to Thomas Jefferson in France at Thomas Jefferson's request.  Daughters of the Eppes studied natural and agricultural sciences, noting what times of year crops came in as well as when Eastern whip-poor-wills arrived and started singing.  One of the daughters, Lucy Elizabeth, died in 1784 and was buried at Eppington.  Mary (Polly) Jefferson (1778–1804), married in 1797 her cousin, John Wayles Eppes (1772–1823) and spent much of her time at Eppington.

In 1790, Charles Eppes had 124 slaves and 2 white overseers living on Eppington.   The yard near the house was a service yard, an area for the house slaves to do work such as smoking country ham, milking cows, churning butter and drawing water from a well.  A fence line appears to have kept the field slaves separate from house slaves.  The service yard was hidden from visitors with tended gardens, orchards and lawns.  The value of the slave's labor added greatly to the wealth of the plantation until the American Civil War. As early as 1806, a school building was on the property.  Later, by the mid-eighteen hundreds, the building was converted into a kitchen to replace a previous building that had been the kitchen.

Archibald Thweatt

Archibald Thweatt acquired Eppington over several purchases starting in December 1812.  Epps Falls, at Eppington, were deemed dangerous for passing boats by the Virginia General Assembly. The General Assembly, in 1819, gave Archibald Thweatt, owner of Eppington, compensation from any damages but allowed the Upper Appomattox Canal company to build a dam and locks around the falls.  Archibald Thweatt and his heirs were also given leave to build a grist mill on the dam.   Archibald Thweatt raised Merino wool.  Also, in 1819, he made a land arrangement which was critical to keep open the right of way road from Richmond to Petersburg.

When the Upper Appomattox Canal Navigation System was complete, neighboring farmers could ship farm produce from the docks at Eppington.  There were large loading facilities.  When coal was first mined at the Clover Hill Pits, in 1837, it was taken by mule, later by rail, to the docks at Epps Falls.  A boat that could carry seven tons of coal, made a four-day round trip to Petersburg for two dollars and thirty eight cents. Rail Service to the docks was discontinued when the Clover Hill Railroad was built to the James River.  But it was later added back when the successor, the Brighthope Railway was expanded in 1881.

References

Plantation houses in Virginia
Houses on the National Register of Historic Places in Virginia
Georgian architecture in Virginia
Houses completed in 1768
Houses in Chesterfield County, Virginia
National Register of Historic Places in Chesterfield County, Virginia
1768 establishments in Virginia